Parliamentary elections were held in Chad on 4 March 1962, following a change to the constitution which had made the country a one-party state with the Chadian Progressive Party as the sole legal party. It therefore won all seats in the National Assembly. Voter turnout was 87.5%.

Results

References

Chad
1962 in Chad
Elections in Chad
One-party elections
March 1962 events in Africa